Bone morphogenetic protein receptor type II or BMPR2 is a serine/threonine receptor kinase encoded by the BMPR2 gene. It binds bone morphogenetic proteins, members of the TGF beta superfamily of ligands, which are involved in paracrine signaling. BMPs are involved in a host of cellular functions including osteogenesis, cell growth and cell differentiation. Signaling in the BMP pathway begins with the binding of a BMP to the type II receptor. This causes the recruitment of a BMP type I receptor, which the type II receptor phosphorylates. The type I receptor phosphorylates an R-SMAD, a transcriptional regulator.

Function 
Unlike the TGFβ type II receptor, which has a high affinity for TGF-β1, BMPR2 does not have a high affinity for BMP-2, BMP-7 and BMP-4,  unless it is co-expressed with a type I BMP receptor.
On ligand binding, a receptor complex is formed, consisting of two type II and two type I transmembrane
serine/threonine kinases. Type II receptors phosphorylate and activate type I receptors which autophosphorylate, then
bind and activate SMAD transcriptional regulators. They bind to BMP-7, BMP-2 and, less efficiently, BMP-4. Binding is weak but enhanced by the presence of type I receptors for BMPs.  In TGF beta signaling all of the receptors exist in homodimers before ligand binding. In the case of BMP receptors only a small fraction of the receptors exist in homomeric forms before ligand binding. Once a ligand has bound to a receptor, the amount of homomeric receptor oligomers increase, suggesting that the equilibrium shifts towards the homodimeric form. The low affinity for ligands suggests that BMPR2 may differ from other type II TGF beta receptors in that the ligand may bind the type I receptor first.

Oocyte Development 

BMPR2 is expressed on both human and animal granulosa cells, and is a crucial receptor for bone morphogenetic protein 15 (BMP15) and growth differentiation factor 9 (GDF 9).  These two protein signaling molecules and their BMPR2-mediated effects play an important role in follicle development in preparation for ovulation.   However, BMPR2 can't bind BMP15 and GDF9 without the assistance of bone morphogenetic protein receptor 1B (BMPR1B) and transforming growth factor β receptor 1 (TGFβR1) respectively.  There is evidence that the BMPR2 signaling pathway is disrupted in the case of polycystic ovary syndrome, possibly by hyperaldosterism.

It appears that the hormones estrogen and follicle stimulating hormone (FSH) have roles in regulating expression of BMPR2 in granulosa cells.  Experimental treatment in animal models with estradiol with or without FSH increased BMPR2 mRNA expression while treatment with FSH alone decreased BMPR2 expression.  However, in human granulosa-like tumor cell line (KGN), treatment with FSH increased BMPR2 expression.

Clinical significance 

At least 70 disease-causing mutations in this gene have been discovered. An inactivating mutation in the BMPR2 gene has been linked to pulmonary arterial hypertension.

BMPR2 functions to inhibit the proliferation of vascular smooth muscle tissue. It functions by promoting the survival of pulmonary arterial endothelial cells, therefore preventing arterial damage and adverse inflammatory responses. It also inhibits pulmonary arterial proliferation in response to growth factors, which prevents the closing of arteries by proliferating endothelial cells. When this gene is inhibited, vascular smooth muscle proliferates and can cause pulmonary hypertension, which, among other things, can lead to cor pulmonale, a condition that causes the right side of the heart to fail. The dysfunction of BMPR2 can also lead to an elevation in pulmonary arterial pressure due to an adverse response of the pulmonary circuit to injury.

It is especially important to screen for BMPR2 mutations in relatives of patients with idiopathic pulmonary hypertension, for these mutations are present in >70% of familial cases.

There have been studies which has correlated BMPR2 with exercise induced elevation of PA pressure by measuring tricuspid regurgitation velocity by echocardiography.

References

External links 
 BMPR2 gene variant database 
  GeneReviews/NCBI/NIH/UW entry on Heritable Pulmonary Arterial Hypertension
  OMIM entries on  Heritable Pulmonary Arterial Hypertension
 

Bone morphogenetic protein
Developmental genes and proteins
TS domain
S/T kinase
Receptors
EC 2.7.11